Xin Bu Liao Qing may refer to
 Xin Bu Liao Qing (film) or C'est la vie, mon chéri, a Cantonese film
 Xin Bu Liao Qing (TV series) or C'est La Vie, Mon Chéri, a series starring Fiona Sit and Aloys Chen based on the film
 "Xin bu liao qing", the series theme song by Jane Zhang and Fiona Sit, included on It's My Day
 "Xin bu liao qing", a song by Jam Hsiao from Love Moments

See also 
 Bu liao qing (disambiguation)